Gayglers is a term for the gay, lesbian, bisexual and transgender employees of Google. The term was first used for all LGBT employees at the company in 2006, and was conceived as a portmanteau between "Google", the company they worked for, and "gay", a term referring to homosexual men, and by extension, LGBT people.

Other than its own in-application resources, Google provides no way for users to report anti-LGBTQ+ and other hate speech violations on its platforms. There is presently no way for the public to get in contact with Google's internal LGBTQ+ teams or the "Gayglers" community within Google to report instances of hate speech or discrimination.

See also

 Gay and Lesbian Employees at Microsoft
 GLIFAA, organization representing LGBT persons in U.S. foreign affairs agencies and entities

References

External links
 
 Interview with Google's Bennet Marks

Google employees
LGBT business organizations
2000s neologisms